Adolino Bedin Regional Airport  is the airport serving Sorriso, Brazil.

It is managed by contract by Infraero.

Airlines and destinations

Access

See also

 List of airports in Brazil

References

External links

Airports in Mato Grosso